The University of Wisconsin–Milwaukee at Washington County is a campus of the College of General Studies, University of Wisconsin-Milwaukee, and is located in West Bend, Wisconsin, United States. In 2018, the college became a regional campus of the University of Wisconsin-Milwaukee.

History
The founding of a University of Wisconsin System campus in Washington County began with the purchase of land owned by local farmer Carl Pick and UW Regent approval of the site on November 12, 1965. Groundbreaking for the new campus took place on July 12, 1967 and classes first started in September, 1968. The campus has consistently expanded from 1980 to 2009 because of increased enrollment and University program offerings.

The current campus administrator is Dr. Alan Paul Price. The campus is part of the College of General Studies at the University of Wisconsin-Milwaukee and Dr. Simon J. Bronner is its dean.

Academics
UWM at Washington County, through collaborative arrangements with four-year campuses, offers bachelor's degree programs in addition to a guaranteed transfer to any University of Wisconsin System four-year university.

References

External links
Official website

University of Wisconsin-Milwaukee at Washington County
Education in Washington County, Wisconsin
Educational institutions established in 1968
Buildings and structures in Washington County, Wisconsin
Two-year colleges in the United States
Washington County
Washington County